Holy Trinity Church is the Anglican parish church of Rudgwick, a village in the Horsham district of West Sussex, England.

The oldest part of the church is the font, which is made from Horsham or Sussex Marble and dates from the 12th century. The tower of the present church was built in 13th century though much of the material probably came from the older church that was pulled down to make way for the current building. Parts of the south wall may have been retained from the original church and so may be as old as the tower. The majority of the rest of the church dates from the 14th century with some from the 15th. The vestry is Victorian. The church is a Grade I Listed building.

History 

Holy Trinity dates from the 13th century, when about the year 1260 Alard the Fleming who owned the great manor of Pulborough and was granted the right to hold a fair at Rudgwick on “the eve, feast and morrow of the Holy Trinity” (Trinity Sunday).

List of rectors, vicars and curates

Rectors

Vicars

Curates

The church today 
Holy Trinity Church was designated a Grade I Listed building on 22 September 1959.

See also 
Bishop of Chichester
Bishop of Horsham
Bishop of Lewes
Church of England
Diocese of Chichester
Grade I listed buildings in West Sussex
List of places of worship in Horsham (district)

References

Notes

Bibliography

Grade I listed churches in West Sussex
Church of England church buildings in West Sussex
Horsham District